The Upper Room is location of the Last Supper that Jesus Christ took with his disciples.

The Upper Room may also refer to:

 The Cenacle, the traditional site of the Last Supper.
 The Upper Room (band), a defunct UK rock music band
 The Upper Room (Devotional and Ministry Organization), a worldwide publisher of the daily devotional guide of the same name
 The Upper Room (paintings), an installation of paintings by Chris Ofili
 In the Upper Room, a ballet by U.S. choreographer Twyla Tharp, first performed in 1986
 "The Upper Room", a song made popular by Mahalia Jackson